Redenção (Portuguese for "redemption") may refer to:

Places
Redenção, Ceará, Brazil
Redenção, Pará, Brazil
Redenção da Serra, São Paulo, Brazil

Entertainment
Redenção (album), the fourth album by the Brazilian alternative rock band Fresno
Redenção (1966 telenovela), a Brazilian telenovela